Dimitri Roditchev is a French physicist of Russian-Ukrainian origin, specializing in electronic properties of nano-materials, superconductors, electron transport, and quantum tunneling phenomena. He is a professor at ESPCI ParisTech and a research director at CNRS (on leave from).

Laureate of Prix Louis Ancel. of French Physical Society (Société Française de Physique) in 2003 for his works on tunneling spectroscopy of high temperature superconductors, Dimitri Roditchev works in Laboratoire de Physique et d'Études des Matériaux (LPEM) where he is team leader of QuantumSpecs group, director of joint team QuEST between the laboratories LPEM-ESPCI and INSP-UPMC, and member of direction board of LPEM.

The research of Dimitri Roditchev at Moscow State University concerned studies of electronic properties of disordered metals and insulators, in relation with metal-insulator and superconductor-insulator phase transitions. In France since 1991, his activities include basic research (ultimately confined superconductivity, quantum vortex, proximity phenomena in hybrid systems, near-critical superconducting states, superconductivity of atomic layers at surfaces in relation with spin-orbit interaction, metal-insulator transition etc.) and engineering of high precision cryogenic equipment for scientific research.

The teaching activity of Dimitri Roditchev includes lectures in Condensed Matter Physics (both basic and advanced levels), advising personal research projects at l’ESPCI-ParisTech. He is author of popular science articles and books, public conferences and interviews with the media.

References

Selected bibliography

20th-century Ukrainian physicists
Year of birth missing (living people)
Living people
21st-century French physicists